is a train station in Nichinan, Miyazaki Prefecture, Japan.

Lines

Layout 
The station consists of an island platform serving two tracks at grade, with a siding. The station building is a timber built structure in loghouse style with wooden fittings and furniture inside. It is unstaffed and serves only as a waiting room.

Adjacent stations

History
The line was then extended northwards in phases, with Kitagō opening as the northern terminus on 28 October 1941. Subsequently, Japanese National Railways (JNR), the postwar successor of JGR, extended the track further north from Kitagō towards . The linkup was completed on 8 May 1963, whereupon the stretch from Shibushi through Kitagō to Minami-Miyazaki was designated as the Nichinan Line. With the privatization of JNR on 1 April 1987, the station came under the control of JR Kyushu.

Passenger statistics
In fiscal 2016, the station was used by an average of 71 passengers (boarding only) per day.

See also
List of railway stations in Japan

References

External links
Ibii (JR Kyushu)

Railway stations in Miyazaki Prefecture
Railway stations in Japan opened in 1941